Lin Li-ju (born 4 February 1967) is a Taiwanese table tennis player. She competed in the women's singles event at the 1988 Summer Olympics.

References

1967 births
Living people
Taiwanese female table tennis players
Olympic table tennis players of Taiwan
Table tennis players at the 1988 Summer Olympics
Place of birth missing (living people)
20th-century Taiwanese women